Rosencrantz & Guildenstern Are Dead is a 1990 tragicomedy film written and directed by Tom Stoppard based on his 1966 play of the same name. Like the play, the film depicts two minor characters from William Shakespeare's play Hamlet, Rosencrantz and Guildenstern, who find themselves on the road to Elsinore Castle at the behest of the King of Denmark.

They encounter a band of players before arriving to find that they are needed to try to discern what troubles the prince Hamlet. Meanwhile, they ponder the meaning of their existence.

Filmed around Zagreb, Croatia and in Brežice Castle, Slovenia, the movie won the Golden Lion at the 47th Venice International Film Festival.

The film stars Gary Oldman as Rosencrantz and Tim Roth as Guildenstern, although a running theme throughout has many characters, themselves included, uncertain as to which is which. It also features Richard Dreyfuss as the leading player, Iain Glen as Hamlet, Ian Richardson as Polonius, Joanna Miles as Gertrude, and Donald Sumpter as King Claudius. This was Stoppard's first and, to date, only film as a director.

Plot
The film, like the play, focuses on Rosencrantz and Guildenstern and their actions (or lack thereof) within the play of Hamlet. The film begins as they travel on horseback to Elsinore, contemplating fate, memory and language. Rosencrantz finds and continually flips a coin which always comes up heads, causing Guildenstern to conclude that something is wrong with reality.

They meet a travelling troupe of tragedians on the way, and during their conversation with the lead Player, they are mysteriously transported into the action of Hamlet at Elsinore. They wander around the castle, trying to catch up to the action and understand what is going on by listening to other parts of the play. They are asked by the Danish royal couple to stay awhile in order to help find out the cause of, and hopefully the cure for, Prince Hamlet's gloomy state. They spend their time outside the scenes in Hamlet trying to figure out what is wrong with the prince and what is required of them.

The remainder of the play follows the Shakespearean drama whenever the two characters are "on stage", while the title heroes remain largely occupied with the futile hazards of daily life whenever the "main action" is elsewhere. Soon the very same theatre troupe arrives to perform at court, as part of the Bard's tragedy.

The Player simultaneously castigates them for abandoning their real play on the road, which cannot exist without an audience, and explains some of the plot and logic of conventional rules of plot-staging and -writing.

Ultimately, they are sent to England and outside the action of the play again. The final part takes place on the ship to England, where they read the letter they are to deliver with Hamlet – discovering that it is an order for his death. They decide to pretend they never saw it. Hamlet replaces the letter, and (as described in Shakespeare's play) escapes on an attacking pirate ship.

Rosencrantz and Guildenstern worry about what they are to do now that Hamlet is gone, unaware that Hamlet has altered the letter so that it calls for their deaths rather than his own. The Player finishes the action by reading the letter that sentences them to death. Guildenstern, still trying to struggle against destiny, stabs The Player with the other man's dagger, only to find that the weapon is a theatrical prop.

Scenes of the deaths of Ophelia, Laertes, Gertrude, Claudius and Hamlet are shown, and both Rosencrantz and Guildenstern, finally accepting their fate, are hanged. The film ends with the tragedians packing up their cart and continuing on their way.

Cast

Daniel Day-Lewis was to be cast as Guildenstern, but abruptly halted his acting career due to stress. He was replaced by Roth, who had also been in contention for the role.

Reception
Critical reaction for the film tended towards the positive, with an overall rating of 61% on the review aggregator website Rotten Tomatoes, based on 31 reviews. The website's consensus reads, "Rosencrantz and Guildenstern Are Dead struggles in its journey from stage to screen, but a well-chosen trio of veteran talents keep things consistently watchable." A common criticism in negative reviews was that the material is more suited to the stage than to the screen; examples include Vincent Canby's review, in which he says, "[Stoppard] delights in sounds and meanings, in puns, in flights of words that soar and swoop as if in visual display. On the stage, this sort of thing can be great fun ... In the more realistic medium of film, so many words can numb the eardrums and weigh upon the eyelids like old coins. This is the effect of 'Rosencrantz and Guildenstern Are Dead'." Similarly, Roger Ebert states that "the problem is that this material was never meant to be a film, and can hardly work as a film."

The film won the Golden Lion at the Venice Film Festival as well as the Fantasporto Directors' Week Award. For his work in the film, Oldman was nominated for the 1991 Independent Spirit Award for Best Male Lead.

Home media
The film was released on DVD in the UK in 2003, and in the US in 2005, featuring interviews with Oldman, Roth, Dreyfuss, and Stoppard.

See also
 Rosencrantz and Guildenstern Are Undead

References

External links

 
 
 
 

1990 films
1990 comedy-drama films
1990 independent films
British comedy-drama films
American comedy-drama films
Films about actors
Films based on Hamlet
British films based on plays
American films based on plays
British independent films
Golden Lion winners
Films directed by Tom Stoppard
Films with screenplays by Tom Stoppard
Films scored by Stanley Myers
American independent films
Metafictional works
Films based on adaptations
Films shot in Croatia
1990s English-language films
1990s American films
1990s British films